Dehdati (also Romanized as Dehdātī, Deh Dātī, and Deh-e Datī; also known as Raḩmatābād, Dāydātī, and Deydātī) is a village in Holunchekan Rural District in the Central District of Qasr-e Qand County, Sistan and Baluchestan Province, Iran. At the 2006 census, its population was 251, in 39 families.

References 

Populated places in Qasr-e Qand County